Raquel González may refer to:
 Raquel González (athlete)
 Raquel González (wrestler)